The tenor horn (British English; alto horn in American English, Althorn in Germany; occasionally referred to as E horn) is a brass instrument in the saxhorn family and is usually pitched in E. It has a bore that is mostly conical, like the flugelhorn and euphonium, and normally uses a deep, cornet-like mouthpiece.

It is most commonly used in British brass bands, and Mexican banda music whereas the French horn tends to take the corresponding parts in concert bands and orchestras. However, the tenor horn has occasionally been used as an alternative to the French horn in concert bands.

Description
The tenor horn is a valved brass instrument (in E) which has a predominantly conical bore like that of the euphonium and flugelhorn. It uses a deep funnel- or cup-shaped mouthpiece. The tenor horn's conical bore and deep mouthpiece produce a mellow, rounded tone that is often used as a middle voice, supporting the melodies of the trumpets, cornets, or flugelhorns, and fills the gap above the lower tenor and bass instruments (the trombone, baritone horn, euphonium, and tuba). Its valves are typically, though not exclusively, piston valves.

The tenor horn has been made and is made in various shapes: the most common in the United States and the UK, and in most other parts of the world, is a sort of mini-tuba shape, with the bell pointing upward, which may help the voice blend before reaching the audience. In contrast, the solo horn (found mainly in Europe) looks like (and indeed effectively is) an enlarged flugelhorn, with the bell pointing forward, projecting more toward the audience. Another older and lesser-known variant has the bell facing backward (for military marching bands that preceded the soldiers, thus helping them hear better and keep better time in marching). Still another variant has a detachable bell, easily rotated to point in the direction of the player's choice.

The standard bell-up horn comes in two basic shapes - one with the beginning of the bell looping over the top of the valves and the other looping below the valves.

These types are the most frequently encountered in the United States and UK. Only the standard upright instrument is seen in UK brass bands.

In Europe, Červený have been manufacturing tenor horns since 1852. They currently offer models of the instrument looped like a classic horn and an oval model shaped like a Wagner tuba, all models having rotary valves, as opposed to the more common piston valves.

Within a British brass band, the tenor horn section usually plays a unique part in the middle of the band, with the Solo Horn having frequent solo passages. However, it is less often featured as a solo instrument, but is increasingly gaining popularity as one. The instrument's timbre, with little attack or resonance, as well as the parts it usually plays, makes the section difficult to hear individually, even in professional studio recordings. Despite this, the horn section contributes greatly to the rich mellow sound of a brass band. Tenor horns, especially those built in the middle of the 20th century, typically have very poor projection and power, so much so that they quickly became known as the "cinderella" of the brass band, hiding between the much more powerful cornets and trombones. This reputation played no small part in discouraging composers outside of the British brass band from writing for the tenor horn, and it certainly had an adverse effect on the instrument's popularity outside the UK. In more recent years, however, there have been many attempts by various makers to create a tenor horn with much better power and projection while still retaining the instrument's characteristic "narrow-mellow" timbre. A few of these modern instruments have become especially popular within the UK; the Besson Sovereign and the Yamaha Maestro have dominated the tenor horn market over the last decade or so.

Today, different makes of tenor horns have a wide range of bore sizes. Narrow-bore instruments, such as those made by the former Besson company, tend to emphasise the tonal delicacy of older instruments and play more like a French-styled flugelhorn, while larger-bore instruments like those made by Courtois have a weight of sound much greater than traditional tenor horns, playing much more like a conical-bored cornet. There are even very rare instruments that have a fourth valve that functions similar to the F trigger on a trombone. Good, well-made instruments should, however, regardless of bore size, retain a light, velvety and mellow tone quality.

Range
The nominal range of the tenor horn (expressed in concert pitch) is from the A an octave and a minor third below middle C to the E an octave and a minor third above middle C (A2 to E5 in scientific pitch notation). Experienced players can reach at least a major third higher than this. Additionally, as the tenor horn is a whole-bore brass instrument, most players can play some pedal tones, the  fundamentals (first partials) of (at least) the shorter tubing lengths.

Notation
Tenor horn parts are written in the treble clef. The tenor horn is an E transposing instrument written a major sixth above concert pitch: the tenor horn notation for middle C represents the E below middle C in concert pitch (E3 in scientific pitch notation).

History
The instrument known today as the tenor/alto horn was developed in the 1840s by the Belgian instrument maker Adolphe Sax who, among other instrument design activities, designed two similar families of valved brass instruments, the saxhorn and the saxotromba.  The surviving E alto instruments by Sax all have inner diameters described in the saxotromba patent.  In this patent the soprano voice (descant) is tuned in E and thence descending through B (contralto) to E (alto).  The next family member below the alto saxotromba was described as a baritone in B. Ascending from baritone, logically the next E family member above it is a tenor. The inconsistency spread across multiple descriptions and patents over decades apparently is the source of confusion as regards the names tenor vs. alto horn.

The modern instrument has a larger diameter and now resembles Sax's specification of the saxhorn more than it does that of the saxotromba.

A great deal of interesting historical technical information on the saxhorn is found in the "Saxhorn" entry of Grove's Dictionary of Music and Musicians, Vol. 4 (1909).

In the 1970s, King Musical Instruments produced a variation on the tenor/alto horn, called the "altonium". This instrument was keyed in F, and it utilized the same mouthpiece as the French horn. From their 1971 catalog, King Instruments produced two models of the altonium: numbers 1147 and 1148. The 1147 was a straight model, and the 1148 was a bell forward model.

In the US, the alto horn is colloquially known as the "peck horn", supposedly because these instruments were employed in band music to "peck away at" the off-beats.  This name is mentioned in The Music Man, and a french horn-patterned peck horn can be seen in the scene where Professor Hill is explaining the Think System as applied to Beethoven's Minuet in G and a small boy asks him how to play it.

Repertoire
The tenor horn is very rarely included in the symphony orchestra, where its place is taken by the French horn. Instead, it is a fixture of British brass bands, where it often plays a role similar to that of the orchestral horn in the symphony orchestra. The tenor horn has also been used in concert bands as a replacement for the French horn. In the past, many publishers included parts in both Eb (for the tenor horn) and F (for the French horn). These parts were the same, just transposed into the pitch of the given instrument. Some publishers still follow this practice.

Although Gustav Mahler orchestrated his Seventh Symphony to include one "tenorhorn in B", that instrument is more akin to the baritone horn.

Partial list of solo repertoire:

 Sonata for Alto Horn and Piano (1943)—Paul Hindemith.
 Sonata for E Horn and Piano, Op. 75—John Golland
 September Fantasy (1977)—Eric Ball
 Masquerade for Tenor Horn and Brass Band (1985)—Philip Sparke
 A Hornting We Will Go for Tenor Horn and Piano, Op. 151 (1997)—Derek Bourgeois
 Concerto for E Tenor Horn and Brass Band, Op. 194 (2003)—Derek Bourgeois
 Aria for Tenor Horn and Brass Band (2003)—Philip Sparke
 Capricorno for Tenor Horn and Brass Band (2009)—Philip Sparke
 Sonata for Tenor Horn and Piano, Op. 304 (2011)—Derek Bourgeois
 Rajaz – concerto for tenor horn and chamber ensemble (2013)—Idin Samimi Mofakham
 Sunday in the Park for Tenor Horn and Brass Band (2016)—Philip Sparke

References

External links

International Alto/Tenor Horn Project
Tenor Horn.com
A Tenor Horn/Alto Horn FAQ
Al's Tenor Horn page

Brass instruments
E-flat instruments
Horns